Jean-Marie Bertrand Nadjombe (born 6 September 2001) is a professional footballer who plays as a left-back for Fortuna Köln. Born in Germany, he represents the Togo national team.

Club career
Nadjombe joined the youth academy of Fortuna Köln, and worked his way up through all their junior levels. On 2 June 2020, he signed his first professional contract with the club.

International career
Nadjombe was born in Cologne, Germany to Togolese parents. He debuted with the Togo national team in a 2–0 2022 FIFA World Cup qualification loss to Senegal national team on 1 September 2021.

References

External links
 

2001 births
Living people
Citizens of Togo through descent
German people of Togolese descent
Sportspeople from Cologne
Togolese footballers
German footballers
Association football fullbacks
Togo international footballers
Regionalliga players
SC Fortuna Köln players